Oliver Poole may refer to:

Oliver Poole, 1st Baron Poole (1911–1993), British Conservative politician, soldier and businessman
Oliver Poole (journalist), British journalist and author
Oliver Poole (musician), British pianist and composer
Ollie Poole, American football player